The Old Michigan City Light is a decommissioned lighthouse located in the harbor of Michigan City, Indiana.

Built in 1858 at a cost of $8,000, this lighthouse, replaced an 1837 brick & stone light built at the edge of Lake Michigan.  It was the second light at the site, and the predecessor to the Michigan City East Light, to which the lantern, lens and light were moved in 1904; it being the new light at the end of the newly extended pier.

It was remodeled in 1904.  Seven Lighthouse keepers and fourteen assistant keepers served here from 1837-1940.

A fourth order Fresnel lens is on display.

It is one of a dozen past or present lighthouses in Indiana.

Location
The lighthouse is located in Washington Park. It is open every day except Mondays from 1 to 4 p.m., except in winter.

See also
Lighthouses in the United States
National Historic Lighthouse Preservation Act

References

Further reading

 Andreas, A.T. (1884) History of Chicago from the Earliest Period to the Present Time,
 Chicago's Front Door, Chicago Public Library Digital Collection, website.
 Chicago, Scribner's Monthly (September 1875) Vol. X, No. 5.
 Graham, Charlote, Another Step into History at Old Michigan City Light (August, 2003) Lighthouse Digest.
 Harris, Patricia. Michigan City: Indiana's Only Lighthouse. The Keeper's Log (Spring, 1987), pp. 22–25.
 Hyde, Charles K., and Ann and John Mahan. (1995) The Northern Lights: Lighthouses of the Upper Great Lakes.  Detroit: Wayne State University Press.  .
 Havighurst, Walter (1943) The Long Ships Passing: The Story of the Great Lakes, Macmillan Publishers.
 Karamanski, T. Ed., Historic Lighthouses and Navigational Aids of the Illinois Shore of Lake Michigan Loyola University & Illinois Historic Preservation Agency, (1989).
 Longstreet, Stephen (1973) Chicago 1860-1919 (New York: McKay).
 Lopez, Victor. "This Old Lighthouse: Chicago Harbor Beacon Gets a Facelift." Coast Guard (September, 1997), pp. 24–25.
 Mayer, Harold M. (1957) The Port of Chicago University of Chicago Press.
 
 Rice, Mary J., Chicago: Port to the World (Follet Publishers, 1969).
 Sapulski, Wayne S., (2001) Lighthouses of Lake Michigan: Past and Present (Paperback) (Fowlerville: Wilderness Adventure Books) ; .

External links

 Old Lighthouse Museum
 National Park Service, Maritime History Project, Inventory of Historic Lights, Michigan City Lights.
 Satellite view at Google Maps.
 

Lighthouses on the National Register of Historic Places in Indiana
Lighthouses completed in 1858
Houses completed in 1858
Michigan City, Indiana
National Register of Historic Places in LaPorte County, Indiana
Transportation buildings and structures in LaPorte County, Indiana
Museums in Laporte County, Indiana
Maritime museums in Indiana
1858 establishments in Indiana